Consort Dugu may refer to:

Dugu sisters
Empress Mingjing (died 558), Emperor Ming of Northern Zhou's wife
Duchess Dugu (died 580s or later), Li Bing's wife
Dugu Qieluo (544–602), Emperor Wen of Sui's wife
Consort Dugu (Tang dynasty) (died 775), Emperor Daizong of Tang's concubine

See also
Queen Dugu (TV series), based on Dugu Qieluo's life